Jennifer Mary Hilary (14 December 1942 – 6 August 2008) was a British actress of stage, film and television. Her first acclaimed stage performance was as "Milly" in Henry James' The Wings of the Dove, which marked her debut in the West End.

Career
Born at Frimley, Surrey, she trained at RADA, and began her acting career with the Liverpool Playhouse in April 1961, aged 18. Her first role was as Nina in The Seagull. She would go on to play such characters as Lady Teazle (The School for Scandal), Isabel (The Enchanted), Cilla Curtis (Amateur Means Lover) and Cecily Cardew (The Importance of Being Earnest). She went on to act with the Birmingham Repertory Theatre.

She debuted across the pond in 1963, performing in Jean Anouilh's The Rehearsal. In 1964, she played "Zoe" in the West End production of James Saunders' A Scent of Flowers. Sir Michael Redgrave included her in the cast of Turgenev's A Month in the Country in 1965. She returned to New York to play the doomed "Sasha" in Chekhov's Ivanov at the Shubert Theatre in 1966. Back in London, she played "Ginny" in the hit 1967 production of Alan Ayckbourn's Relatively Speaking.

Later years and death
Later in life she founded a flower-arranging business. In 2001, she provided the floral arrangements for actor Michael Williams's memorial service at Covent Garden.

Hilary died from cancer in London on 6 August 2008, at the age of 65.

Awards
In 1961 she was awarded the Bancroft Gold Medal.

Filmography

Film

Television

References

External links
 

1942 births
2008 deaths
20th-century English actresses
21st-century English actresses
English film actresses
English stage actresses
English television actresses
Alumni of RADA
Deaths from cancer in England
People from Frimley